Japanese rose is a common name for several plants and may refer to:

 Kerria japonica, native to China, Japan, and Korea
 Rosa multiflora
 Rosa rugosa